Vangudi is a village in the Udayarpalayam taluk of Ariyalur district, Tamil Nadu, India. It is located 235 km away from Chennai.

Demographics 

As per the 2001 census, Vangudi had a total population of 4795 with 2419 males and 2376 females.

References 

Villages in Ariyalur district